De Brauw Blackstone Westbroek N.V. is a Dutch law firm headquartered in Amsterdam with branch offices in Brussels, London, Shanghai and Singapore. The firm has 60 partners and 300 other qualified lawyers. The firm was founded in 1871.

Areas of practice
In 2018, Chambers & Partners ranked De Brauw top tier in twelve practice areas, which is the second highest of any Dutch firm. De Brauw's main practice areas are:

Arbitration
Capital Markets
Competition & Regulation
Construction
Corporate Advisory
Corporate Governance
Employment & Employee Benefits
Energy, Infrastructure & Environment 
Finance & Restructuring
Financial Institutions
Financial Markets Regulation
Insolvency
Insurance
Intellectual Property
International trade
Investment Management 
Litigation
Mergers & Acquisitions
Pensions
Privacy & Data Security
Private Equity
Real Estate
Regulatory & Criminal Enforcement
Supreme Court Litigation
Tax

Recent deals and matters
 SBM Offshore settles with Dutch Public Prosecutor’s Service over alleged improper payments
 SHV and Nutreco announce a recommended cash offer of EUR 3.5 billion for Nutreco
 IPO Affirmed on NASDAQ
 Imtech sells its ICT division to VINCI
 Klépierre to take over Corio in European mall push
 IPO IMCD on Euronext Amsterdam
 Gilde Buy Out Partners and Parcom Capital to sell Nedschroef to PMC for EUR 325 million
 Ahold reaches agreement in principle to settle Waterbury class action in the United States
 Advising D.E MASTER BLENDERS 1753 in antitrust case against Nestlé
 Advent makes a recommended cash offer for UNIT4

International connections
De Brauw Blackstone Westbroek has been part of a European network of law firms, sometimes called ‘Best Friends’, for a number of years,
comprising: Slaughter and May (UK), Bredin Prat (France), Hengeler Mueller (Germany), Uría Menéndez (Spain), BonelliErede (Italy).

See also 
Law firms of the Netherlands

References

External links
Official website
Legal 500 Firm Profile
Chambers and Partners Firm Profile 
 

Law firms of the Netherlands
Law firms established in 1871